Beverbeek Classic is a single-day bicycle road race held annually in Hamont-Achel, in the Belgian region of Limburg. From 1998 to 2003, it was reserved to amateurs. Since 2005, it is organized as a 1.2 event on the UCI Europe Tour.

Winners

External links
 Official Website

UCI Europe Tour races
Cycle races in Belgium
Recurring sporting events established in 1998
1998 establishments in Belgium
Hamont-Achel